The Botanical Journal of the Linnean Society is a scientific journal publishing original papers relating to the taxonomy of all plant groups and fungi, including anatomy, biosystematics, cytology, ecology, ethnobotany, electron microscopy, morphogenesis, palaeobotany, palynology and phytochemistry.

The journal is published by the Linnean Society of London and is available in both print and searchable online formats.

Like the Biological Journal of the Linnean Society (published since 1858), the journal evolved from the Society's original journal Transactions, which covered early papers by Darwin and Wallace, becoming an essential, contemporary publication for all those currently working in the field of botany.

References

External links
 Special Issue: Plant anatomy: traditions and perspectives
 Special Issue: Bromeliaceae as a model group in understanding the evolution of Neotropical biota
 Special Issue: Grass systematics, evolution and conservation: multidisciplinary perspectives
 Botanical Journal of the Linnean Society at SCImago Journal Rank
 Botanical Journal of the Linnean Society at HathiTrust Digital Library
 Botanical Journal of the Linnean Society at Botanical Scientific Journals

Botany journals
Linnean Society of London